Unité de catalyse et de chimie du solide de Lille (Laboratory of Catalysis and Solid State Chemistry - UCCS) is a French research laboratory (UMR CNRS 8181) focused on process engineering and chemical engineering.

It is located in Lille, Lens and Béthune and is a part of COMUE Lille Nord de France. It is affiliated to the Institut des molécules et de la matière condensée de Lille (IMMCL-Chevreul).
UCCS research teams support academic activities in the following sites of the COMUE Lille Nord de France :
 École centrale de Lille
 École nationale supérieure de chimie de Lille
 University of Lille
 Artois University

It supports doctoral researches and hosts PhD doctoral candidates in relationship with the European Doctoral College Lille Nord de France.

Research area
Research area are focused on :
 Catalysis
 Solid-state chemistry
 Process engineering
and are supported by large experimental installations in the research lab.

External links
 Institut des Molécules et de la Matière Condensée de Lille
 Laboratoire de catalyse de Lille
 Unité de Catalyse et de Chimie du Solide

University of Lille Nord de France